"The Girls" is a song by Scottish musician Calvin Harris. It was released as the second single from his debut studio album, I Created Disco (2007), on 4 June 2007. "The Girls" was Harris' highest charting single on the UK Singles Chart, reaching number three on 10 June 2007. A "bootleg" version of the song leaked on file sharing several months before I Created Disco was released. The song has been covered by electropop outfit Dragonette, who changed the main lyric to "The Boys".

Music video
The video features a group of women in brightly coloured wigs and underwear performing a dance routine around Harris.

Track listings

Charts

Weekly charts

Year-end charts

Certifications

Release history

In popular culture
"The Girls" has often been associated with the fictional EastEnders characters Ronnie and Roxy Mitchell. When they were introduced in 2007, a trailer announcing their arrival featured the song which showed Roxy dancing wildly and Ronnie spraying the residents with a soda syphon as some cheer them on whilst others look dismayed. The song featured in a 2013 episode of show which showed Roxy dancing to the song whilst drunk before falling off a table. "The Girls" was finally featured in the pair's final episode in 2017 at Ronnie's wedding where the arrival trailer is recreated as Ronnie and Roxy both spray the wedding attendees with soda syphons.

References

2007 singles
2007 songs
Calvin Harris songs
Columbia Records singles
Songs written by Calvin Harris
Sony BMG singles